Lapparentophis (meaning "Lapparent's snake") is an extinct genus of terrestrial ophidian known from the Kem Kem Beds of Northwestern Africa (Algeria, Morocco & Sudan) that was first described by Robert Hoffstetter in 1959. Two species are known: the type species, L. defrennei from Algeria, and a second species, L. ragei from Morocco, which is only known from the holotype MHNM.KK387 and the paratype MHNM.KK388, two isloated trunk vertebrae. 

Lapparentophis was probably the sister taxon of the slightly younger Pouitella from the Cenomanian of France. Lapparentophis was initially believed to have been a snake, but later studies have found it to fall under Ophidia, the clade which Serpentes also belongs to.

References 

Prehistoric snakes
Snake genera
Fossil taxa described in 1959